John Louis Salkeld (January 21, 1858 – 1941) was a farmer and political figure in Saskatchewan. He represented Moosomin in the Legislative Assembly of Saskatchewan from 1917 to 1925 as a Conservative and from 1925 to 1929 as an independent member.

He was born in Stratford, Ontario, the son of Joseph Salkeld and Eliza Seegmiller, and was educated there. In 1884, Salkeld married Ida Lang. He served as reeve of Spy Hill, Saskatchewan for four years.

References 

Progressive Conservative Party of Saskatchewan MLAs
1858 births
1941 deaths
Farmers from Saskatchewan